A lightbox is a translucent surface illuminated from behind.

Lightbox may also refer to:

Media and entertainment 
 Lightbox.com, a discontinued photoblogging platform
 LightBox Interactive, a USA-based video game developer
 Lightbox (New Zealand), an online TV show streaming service
 Time LightBox, a blog by the photo department of Time Magazine
 Lightbox (album), a 2014 album by Chris Letchford
 The Lightbox, a gallery in Woking, England
 TIFF Bell Lightbox, the headquarters for the Toronto International Film Festival in Toronto

Other uses 
 Lightbox (JavaScript), a particular JavaScript technique that displays images in a browser using modal dialogs
 Light box, an artificial sunlight source used in light therapy

See also 
 Light table